Zhu Xuzhi (1912-8 November 2000) was a general in the People's Liberation Army of China.

Biography
Zhu was born Zhu Wenlin in Linhai, Zhejiang in 1912, son of Zhu Zhikang. He had a formal name used at school, Zhu Wen. He had an elder brother, Zhu Wenbiao. He attended Huipu School, Taizhou High School, and Zhongnan High School. He graduated from Whampoa Military Academy. After college, he went to Jiangxi with Mao Bingwen to fight against the Red Army but was captured during a battle. Zhu joined the Chinese Workers' and Peasants' Red Army in 1931 and joined the Communist Party of China in May 1933. He worked in the 18th Group Army in 1937 and the Political Department of Shandong Column in 1940. In 1943, he was sent to Yan'an to study at the Central Party School of the Communist Party of China. In late 1945, he worked in the PLA Fourth Field Army, at the same year, he was elected as a member of the Seventh National Congress of the Communist Party of China.

In 1953, he became the First Deputy Head of the PLA Air Force Cadre Management Department, he remained in that position until 1960, when he was appointed the Political Commissar of the PLA Air Force Technical Department. He was promoted to the rank of Major General (Shao Jiang) in 1955. In 1969, he was promoted to become the Deputy Chief of Staff of the PLA Air Force.

On November 10, 1971, Zhu was examined in isolation by the Red Guards. He was sent to the May Seventh Cadre Schools to work between 1976 and 1979. From 1979 to 1989, he lived in Jinan, capital of Shandong province. He was politically rehabilitated in February 1988 and died in Beijing on November 8, 2000.

Personal life
Zhu had four sons: Zhu Songbin, Zhu Hanbin, Zhu Yunbin, and Zhu Haibin. His granddaughter, Zhu Zhu (daughter of Zhu Hanbin), is a noted actress and singer.

References

1912 births
2000 deaths
People from Linhai
People's Liberation Army generals from Zhejiang
Whampoa Military Academy alumni
Central Party School of the Chinese Communist Party alumni